SV Deurne is a football club from Deurne, Netherlands. Deurne will be playing in the Sunday Hoofdklasse B (4th tier) in the 2013–14 season.

The club was founded in 1942, when D.O.S. and Deurania merged. Deurne became champions of the 2007–08 Sunday Hoofdklasse B. At that time, the Hoofdklasse was the highest tier of Dutch amateur football.

Deurne won the 2010 and 2013 KNVB District Cup in the Zuid 2 (South 2) District.

References

External links
 Official site

Football clubs in the Netherlands
1942 establishments in the Netherlands
Association football clubs established in 1942
Football clubs in North Brabant
Sport in Deurne, Netherlands